Powers Lake is a city in Burke County, North Dakota, United States. The population was 385 at the 2020 census. Powers Lake was founded in 1909.

Geography
Powers Lake is located at  (48.562009, -102.646159).

Demographics

2010 census
As of the census of 2010, there were 280 people, 137 households, and 76 families residing in the city. The racial makeup of the city was 98.2% White, 1.1% Native American, 0.4% Asian, and 0.4% from two or more races. Hispanic or Latino of any race were 1.1% of the population.

There were 137 households, of which 17.5% had children under the age of 18 living with them, 44.5% were married couples living together, 8.0% had a female householder with no husband present, 2.9% had a male householder with no wife present, and 44.5% were non-families. 41.6% of all households were made up of individuals, and 24.1% had someone living alone who was 65 years of age or older. The average household size was 2.04 and the average family size was 2.76.

The median age in the city was 47.5 years. 18.9% of residents were under the age of 18; 7.6% were between the ages of 18 and 24; 20% were from 25 to 44; 28.1% were from 45 to 64; and 25.4% were 65 years of age or older. The gender makeup of the city was 47.5% male and 52.5% female.

2000 census
As of the census of 2000, there were 309 people, 148 households, and 84 families residing in the city. The population density was 312.1 people per square mile (120.5/km). There were 183 housing units at an average density of 184.8 per square mile (71.4/km). The racial makeup of the city was 97.73% White, 0.32% Native American, 0.32% Asian, 0.32% from other races, and 1.29% from two or more races. Hispanic or Latino of any race were 0.97% of the population.

There were 148 households, out of which 20.9% had children under the age of 18 living with them, 48.0% were married couples living together, 6.8% had a female householder with no husband present, and 42.6% were non-families. 41.9% of all households were made up of individuals, and 29.1% had someone living alone who was 65 years of age or older. The average household size was 2.08 and the average family size was 2.87.

In the city, the population was spread out, with 21.4% under the age of 18, 3.6% from 18 to 24, 23.0% from 25 to 44, 17.5% from 45 to 64, and 34.6% who were 65 years of age or older. The median age was 47 years. For every 100 females, there were 82.8 males. For every 100 females age 18 and over, there were 91.3 males.

The median income for a household in the city was $27,143, and the median income for a family was $36,389. Males had a median income of $30,000 versus $21,875 for females. The per capita income for the city was $14,894. About 3.2% of families and 9.0% of the population were below the poverty line, including none of those under the age of eighteen and 20.2% of those 65 or over.

Climate
This climatic region is typified by large seasonal temperature differences, with warm to hot (and often humid) summers and cold (sometimes severely cold) winters.  According to the Köppen Climate Classification system, Powers Lake has a humid continental climate, abbreviated "Dfb" on climate maps.

See also
 Shrine of Our Lady of the Prairies

References

External links
 City of Powers Lake official website

Cities in Burke County, North Dakota
Cities in North Dakota
Populated places established in 1909
1909 establishments in North Dakota